Wilbur W. Marsh (July 14, 1862 - December 23, 1929), was treasurer of the Democratic National Committee.

Biography
He was born in New York on July 14, 1862. He was a Democratic National Committeeman in 1912 and again in 1916. He was the Committee's treasurer from 1916 to 1924.

He was a delegate to 1920 Democratic National Convention and the 1928 Democratic National Convention representing Iowa.

Marsh died at his home in Waterloo, Iowa, on December 23, 1929, after having a stroke while driving his car.

References

 
1862 births
1929 deaths
Democratic National Committee people
Democratic National Committee treasurers